Unión Deportiva San Pedro is a Spanish football team based in San Pedro Alcántara, Marbella, in the autonomous community of Andalusia. Founded in 1974, it plays in Tercera División RFEF – Group 9, holding home matches at Estadio Municipal de San Pedro Alcántara, with a 5,000-seat capacity.

Season to season

3 seasons in Segunda División B
23 seasons in Tercera División
1 season in Tercera División RFEF

External links
Official website 
La Preferente team profile 
Soccerway team profile

Football clubs in Andalusia
Association football clubs established in 1974
1974 establishments in Spain